Sascha Goc (born April 14, 1979) is a German former professional ice hockey who last played for the Schwenninger Wild Wings of the Deutsche Eishockey Liga (DEL). Goc played in the National Hockey League for the New Jersey Devils and the Tampa Bay Lightning. His younger brothers Marcel and Nikolai currently play for Adler Mannheim.

Playing career
As a youth, Goc played in the 1992 and 1993 Quebec International Pee-Wee Hockey Tournaments with a team from Baden-Württemberg.

Goc was drafted 157th overall by the New Jersey Devils in the 1997 NHL Entry Draft where he played 13 games without scoring a point and collecting four penalty minutes. On November 9, 2001, he was traded by the Devils, along with Josef Boumedienne and Anton Butt to the Tampa Bay Lightning for Andrei Zyuzin. He played in nine games with the Lightning without scoring a point. While in North America he also played in the American Hockey League for the Albany River Rats and the Springfield Falcons. 
In 2002, he went back to Germany to play for Adler Mannheim and before moving to Hannover, where he scored 17 goals and 13 assists for 30 points in 50 games in 2005–06.

On February 1, 2011, in his sixth season with the Scorpions, Goc signed a further two-year contract extension to remain in Hannover.

After the Scorpions ceased operations in the DEL, Goc returned to his original club, the Schwenninger Wild Wings, who coincidentally bought Hannover's license to return to the DEL on July 18, 2013.

He was a member on the Germany hockey team in the 1998 Winter Olympics in Nagano, Japan and in the 2002 Winter Olympics in Salt Lake City, leading Germany to the quarterfinals before losing to the United States 5–0.

Career statistics

Regular season and playoffs

International

References

External links

1979 births
Living people
Albany River Rats players
Adler Mannheim players
German ice hockey defencemen
Hannover Scorpions players
Ice hockey players at the 2006 Winter Olympics
New Jersey Devils draft picks
New Jersey Devils players
Olympic ice hockey players of Germany
People from Calw
Sportspeople from Karlsruhe (region)
Schwenninger Wild Wings players
Springfield Falcons players
Tampa Bay Lightning players
German people of Czech descent
German expatriate ice hockey people
German expatriate sportspeople in the United States
Expatriate ice hockey players in the United States